Michèle Burke (born 1959) is an Irish-born Academy Award-winning make-up artist.

Burke emigrated to Canada with her brother Mark in 1973 and first worked as a model in Montreal before becoming a make-up artist.

She currently holds both Canadian and U.S. citizenship, in addition to her original Irish nationality.

She has won numerous awards, including two Academy Awards for Best Makeup, the first time for Quest for Fire (1981), the second time for Bram Stoker's Dracula (1992).

References

External links

www.micheleburke.com

1959 births
Living people
American make-up artists
American expatriates in Spain
Canadian expatriates in Spain
Irish emigrants to Canada
Canadian emigrants to the United States
Naturalized citizens of Canada
Irish female models
Canadian female models
American female models
People from County Kildare
Complutense University of Madrid alumni
Best Makeup Academy Award winners
Best Makeup BAFTA Award winners
Emmy Award winners
21st-century American women